Joe Cool may refer to:

People 
Joe Burrow (born 1996), American football quarterback
John Dorahy (born 1954), Australian rugby league footballer and coach
Joe Flacco (born 1985), American football quarterback
Joe Montana (born 1956), American football quarterback
Joe Namath (born 1943), American football quarterback

Other uses 
 "Joe Cool" (song), a 1991 single by Girl Monstar
 Snoopy, who adopts the alias in the comic strip Peanuts

See also
 Joe Chill, a fictional criminal from the Batman franchise
 Joe Kuhel, American baseball player and manager